is a former Japanese football player.

Playing career
Tabata was born in Kagoshima Prefecture on April 16, 1979. After graduating from high school, he joined Japan Football League club Albirex Niigata in 1998. The club was promoted to new league J2 League from 1999. However he could hardly play in the match and retired end of 1999 season.

Beach Soccer career
In 2007, Tabata was selected Japan national beach soccer team. He played at Beach Soccer World Cup 7 times (2007, 2008, 2009, 2011, 2013, 2015 and 2017).

Club statistics

References

External links

1979 births
Living people
Association football people from Kagoshima Prefecture
Japanese footballers
J2 League players
Japan Football League (1992–1998) players
Albirex Niigata players
Association football defenders